, or the , is one of the two state guest houses of the Government of Japan. The other state guesthouse is the Kyoto State Guest House.

Today the palace is designated by the Government of Japan as an official accommodation for visiting state dignitaries. Located in the Moto-Akasaka, Minato, Tokyo, the building took on its present function in 1974, having previously been an imperial detached palace. In 2009 the palace was designated as a National Treasure of Japan.

Overview

Location: Tokyo, Minato-ku, Moto-Akasaka-chome No. 1

The building has 15,000 m2 of floor space, and together with a smaller structure in the Japanese style, occupies a 117,000 m2 site.

The main building is a Neo-Baroque style Western building, resembling in particular the Hofburg Palace. It is one of largest buildings constructed during the Meiji period.

The palace is surrounded by a footpath unobstructed by road crossings. The footpath is approximately 3.25 km long (roughly 2 miles).

The railway station nearest the Palace is Yotsuya Station.

History

The territory that Akasaka Palace now occupies was part of the residence of Kishū Domain, one of the major branches of the ruling Tokugawa clan, during the Tokugawa period. After the Meiji Restoration, the Owari presented the land to the Imperial Household.

Designed by the architect  (a student of Josiah Conder), the Neo-Baroque structure was constructed between 1899 and 1909 as a residence for the Crown Prince. Originally it was named Tōgū Palace (ja. lit. "Palace for the Crown Prince") but was later renamed Akasaka Palace when the Crown Prince's residence was moved.

Regent Crown Prince Hirohito resided at Akasaka Palace from September 1923 until September 1928, two months before his coronation. The move was intended to be temporary, but lasted five years. During the renovation of his contemporary residence, Hirohito intended to lodge temporarily at Akasaka Palace, moving in on August 28, 1923. Four days later, Japan was hit by the Great Kantō earthquake on September 1. During his residence in Akasaka Palace, Crown Prince Hirohito married, and fathered two daughters, Princess Sachiko (who died at the age of 6 months) and Princess Shigeko.

After the Second World War, the Government of Japan relieved the Imperial Household of Akasaka Palace. Several governmental offices were installed in the palace, including the National Diet Library which was founded in 1948, Cabinet Legislation Bureau and Organizing Committee of Tokyo Olympics 1964.

Through the economic revival of the country after the Second World War, the Japanese Government established a State Guest House. The former residence of Prince Asaka, currently Tokyo Metropolitan Teien Art Museum, had been used as the state guest house, though it was too small for that purpose. It was decided in 1967 to renovate the former Akasaka Palace as the new state guest house. The renovation was led by architect Togo Murano, took more than five years and 10.8 billion yen, and was completed in 1974.

The first official state guest at the renovated palace was Gerald Ford in 1974, which was the first visit of the incumbent President of the United States to Japan. Since then, the palace has provided accommodations for state and official guests and a venue for international conferences, which have included the G7 summit meetings (1979, 1986 and  1993) and APEC summits.

The venue was closed from 2006 to 2009 for renovation, and was reopened in April 2009. In December 2009, the main building, the main gate and the garden with fountain were designated as a National Treasure of Japan. It was the first designation of assets after the Meiji Restoration as a National Treasure of Japan.

Gallery

See also
Rokumeikan
Imperial Hotel, Tokyo
Palace Hotel, Tokyo
Royal Palace of El Pardo, the state guest house of Spain.
Blair House, the state guest house of the United States
Hyderabad House, the state guest house of India
Diaoyutai State Guesthouse, the state guest house of the People's Republic of China
Grand Hotel (Taipei), the state guest house of the Republic of China

References

External links

Cabinet Office's official site (with photo gallery)

Akasaka, Tokyo
Palaces in Tokyo
Imperial residences in Japan
Tourist attractions in Tokyo
Baroque Revival architecture
National Treasures of Japan
Buildings of the Meiji period
Houses completed in 1909
State guesthouses